Arden Way is a major east-west arterial in Sacramento County, California, United States.

Route description

Sacramento
Arden Way begins at Acoma Street in the North Sacramento area of Sacramento. It is a side street in a light industrial area, running approximately two blocks up to Colfax Street (the portion between Colfax and Barstow Street is a one-way street westbound) and paralleling the Arden-Garden Connector, the westward continuation for major thoroughfare traffic on Arden Way east of Colfax Street, connecting with Garden Highway, hence the name of the connector. After Colfax Street, Arden Way gains it major thoroughfare status as a four-lane roadway, intersecting Del Paso Boulevard (old US 40) and running parallel with the Regional Transit light rail tracks and a residential frontage street of Arden Way up until Royal Oaks Drive. It passes two light rail stations: The Arden/Del Paso station and the Royal Oaks station. Arden Way then travels over the light rail and Union Pacific railroad tracks at a large overpass, where the roadway turns southeast towards the interchange of Business 80 (also known as the Capital City Freeway) and Highway 160, known locally as the Arden Y. Arden Way widens to about 6-7 lanes as it passes Arden Fair Mall, then intersects Exposition Boulevard and Ethan Way, where the roadway turns east, leaving the city of Sacramento and into the unincorporated community of Arden-Arcade.

The unusually large overpass between Evergreen and Harvard Streets was to have been part of the I-80 freeway replacement of what is now the Capital City Freeway (or Business 80). Caltrans abandoned the project in the early 1980s and was turned over to Regional Transit for their light rail system.

Arden-Arcade
After leaving Sacramento, Arden Way immediately intersects Howe Avenue, another major thoroughfare running north-south. After Howe Avenue, the roadway narrows back down to four lanes. It continues east to intersect with other north-south major thoroughfares, including Fulton Avenue, Watt Avenue and Eastern Avenue. As Arden Way meets up with Mission Avenue, it enters the unincorporated community of Carmichael.

Carmichael
After Mission Avenue, Arden Way continues east to Fair Oaks Boulevard, where the roadway then downgrades to a two-lane neighborhood street and turns southeast towards its eastern terminus at the American River Parkway.

It was at this terminus that a bridge was planned to cross the American River and connect to Rod Beaudry Drive in Rancho Cordova, but it was never built and the two roads remain unconnected.  A pedestrian/bicycle bridge (the Harold Richey Memorial Bridge)  crosses the American River at that point, but barricades prevent regular automobile traffic.

Landmarks and points of interest
Arden Fair - An enclosed regional shopping center with 165 shops and anchored by two department stores.
Univision 19 / UniMás 64 TV Studios - Television studios for local Univision owned-and-operated station KUVS-DT (channel 19) and UniMás owned-and-operated station KTFK-DT (channel 64).
St. Ignatius Loyola Parish - A historic local church and private school.

Major cities
Sacramento, California

Local transportation
RT buses 13,  22, 23 and 88 operate on Arden Way. RT light rail stations Arden/Del Paso, Royal Oaks and nearby Swanston serve Arden Way.

Major intersections

References

Streets in Sacramento County, California
Transportation in Sacramento, California